The Soloy Pathfinder 21 was a twin-engined, single-propeller, turboprop aircraft. It is a modification by Soloy Aviation Solutions of a Cessna 208 Caravan airframe.

The aircraft performed its last flight in the late 1990s and was stored for more than 20 years, before being parted out and scrapped.

Design and development
Soloy modified a Cessna 208 to construct a prototype Pathfinder 21, with its first flight in 1995. The Dual Pac PT6D-114A engine used in the Pathfinder 21 gained its FAA Supplemental Type Certificate in 1997. Soloy was attempting to obtain FAA certification for the aircraft conversion, but after completing over 80% of the certification work, Soloy announced that it was halting the entire program. The CEO explained that the FAA requires aircraft with more than nine passengers to have the airframe meet tougher restrictions required by Federal Aviation Regulation (FAR) Part 25, which is a practical impossibility, since the Cessna 208 does not meet those requirements. This requirement made marketing the airplane unfeasible, as the expanded passenger cabin was a major reason for the stretch to begin with.

Specifications

See also

Related development
Cessna 208

References

External links
 Cessna 208 — technical data concerning the Cessna 208
 Soloy.com Soloy Aviation Solutions online, products, brochures, etc.
 Caravan Pilots — Cessna Caravan site; Pilot related
 Soloy plans Pathfinder push (27 May 1998)

1990s United States civil utility aircraft